Santa Magdalena Jicotlán is a town and municipality in Oaxaca in south-western Mexico. 
It is part of the Coixtlahuaca district in the Mixteca Region.
The municipality covers an area of 48.48 km², surrounded by the Sierra Madre Oriental. 
As of the 2010 census, the town (locality) had a population of 92 inhabitants, while the municipality had a total population of 93 (officially, there was one rural resident in a place called Barrio San Miguel). It is the smallest municipality in Mexico in population. (The next-smallest is Santiago Tepetlapa, also in Oaxaca.)
The main economic activity is agriculture, with some people also keeping goats and chickens.

The town has a Catholic church dedicated to Mary Magdalene, built in the mid eighteenth century with baroque influences.
It has a kindergarten and an elementary school, each with one teacher.

References

Municipalities of Oaxaca